Sir Nicholas Bacon (28 December 1510 – 20 February 1579) was Lord Keeper of the Great Seal during the first half of the reign of Queen Elizabeth I of England. He was the father of the philosopher and statesman Sir Francis Bacon.

Life
He was born at Chislehurst, Kent, the second son of Robert Bacon (1479–1548) of Drinkstone, Suffolk, by his wife Eleanor (Isabel) Cage. He graduated from Corpus Christi College, Cambridge in 1527, and, after a period in Paris, he entered Gray's Inn, being called to the Bar in 1533. Following the Dissolution of the Monasteries, Henry VIII gave him a grant of the manors of Redgrave, Botesdale and Gislingham in Suffolk, and Gorhambury, Hertfordshire. Gorhambury belonged to St Albans Abbey and lay near the site of the vanished Roman city of Verulamium (modern day St Albans). From 1563 to 1568 he built a new house, Old Gorhambury House (now a ruin), which later became the home of Francis Bacon, his youngest son.

In 1545 he became a Member of Parliament, representing Dartmouth. The following year, he was made Attorney of the Court of Wards and Liveries, a prestigious and lucrative post, and by 1552 he had risen to become treasurer of Gray's Inn. As a Protestant, he lost preferment under Queen Mary I of England. However, on the accession of her younger sister, Elizabeth in 1558 he was appointed Lord Keeper of the Great Seal, largely owing to the influence of his brother-in-law William Cecil. Shortly afterwards, Bacon was knighted.

Bacon helped secure the position of Archbishop of Canterbury for his friend Matthew Parker, and in his official capacity presided over the House of Lords when Elizabeth opened her first parliament. Though an implacable enemy of Mary, Queen of Scots, he opposed Cecil's policy of war against France, on financial grounds; but he favoured closer links with foreign Protestants, and was aware of the threat to England from the alliance between France and Scotland. In 1559 he was authorized to exercise the full jurisdiction of Lord Chancellor. In 1564 he fell temporarily into the royal disfavour and was dismissed from court, because Elizabeth suspected he was concerned in the publication of a pamphlet, A Declaration of the Succession of the Crowne Imperial of Ingland, by John Hales, which favoured the claim of Lady Catherine Grey (sister of Lady Jane Grey) to the English throne.

Bacon's innocence having been admitted, he was restored to favour, and replied to a writing by Sir Anthony Browne, who had again asserted the rights of the House of Suffolk to which Lady Catherine belonged. He thoroughly distrusted Mary, Queen of Scots; objected to the proposal to marry her to Thomas Howard, 4th Duke of Norfolk; and warned Elizabeth that serious consequences for England would follow her restoration. He seems to have disliked the proposed marriage between the English queen and François, Duke of Anjou, and his distrust of the Roman Catholics and the French was increased by the St Bartholomew's Day massacre. As a loyal English churchman he was ceaselessly interested in ecclesiastical matters, and made suggestions for the better observation of doctrine and discipline in the church.

Death and legacy

He died in London and was buried in Old St Paul's Cathedral, his death calling forth many tributes to him. His grave and monument were destroyed in the Great Fire of London in 1666. A modern monument in the crypt lists his as one of the important graves lost.

He had been an eloquent speaker, a learned lawyer, a generous friend; and his interest in education led him to make several gifts and bequests for educational purposes, including the foundation of a free grammar school at Redgrave in Suffolk.

Marriages and issue
Bacon married firstly, Jane Ferneley (d.1552), whose sister, Anne Ferneley (d.1596), married Sir Thomas Gresham. By Jane Ferneley Bacon had six surviving children, three sons and three daughters:

Sir Nicholas Bacon, 1st Baronet, of Redgrave (c.1540–1624), who married Anne Butts, the only child and daughter of Edmund Butts (a son of Sir William Butts, doctor to King Henry VIII) by his wife Anne Bures, (whose inscribed ledger stone is in Redgrave Church) one of the daughters and co-heiresses of Henry Bures (d.1528) of Acton, Suffolk. Anne Butts was the heir of her uncle Sir William Butts (d.1583), jnr, of Thornage, Norfolk, Sheriff of Norfolk and Suffolk in 1563, whose Easter Sepulchre monument survives in Thornage Church. Three of the daughters and co-heiresses of Henry Bures married three of the sons of Sir William Butts, snr.
Edward Bacon (1548/9 – 1618), who married Helen Little, the daughter of Sir Thomas Little of Bray, Berkshire, by Elizabeth Lyton (daughter of Sir Robert Lyton of Knebworth, Hertfordshire), by whom he was the father of Nathaniel Bacon (1593–1660) and Francis Bacon (1600–1663).
Sir Nathaniel Bacon (c.1546 – November 1622), who first married, in July 1569, Anne Gresham (d.1594), the illegitimate daughter of Sir Thomas Gresham, founder of the Royal Exchange, by Anne Dutton; secondly, on 21 July 1597 he married Dorothy Hopton (c.1570–1629), daughter of Arthur Hopton and widow of William Smith of Burgh Castle, Suffolk.
Elizabeth Bacon, who married firstly Sir Robert Doyley, secondly, Sir Henry Neville, and thirdly Sir William Peryam.
Anne Bacon, who married Sir Henry Woodhouse (d.1624), by whom she was the mother of Sir Henry Woodhouse.
Elizabeth Bacon, who married firstly Francis Wyndham, the son of Sir Edmund Wyndham. and secondly Robert Mansell

In 1553 Sir Nicholas Bacon married secondly Anne Cooke (1528–1610), one of the daughters of Sir Anthony Cooke, by whom he had two sons:

Anthony Bacon (1558–1601)
Francis Bacon (1561–1626), who became Lord Chancellor and was also a philosopher, author and scientist.

Notes

References

External links

Elizabeth Bacon (d.1621), A Who’s Who of Tudor Women: B-Bl. Retrieved 25 March 2013
Bacon, Sir Nicholas (1510-1579), History of Parliament. Retrieved 25 March 2013
Guide to the Sir Nicholas Bacon Collection of English Court and Manorial Documents circa 1200-1785 at the University of Chicago Special Collections Research Center
 

1510 births
1579 deaths
People from St Albans
People from Chislehurst
Alumni of Corpus Christi College, Cambridge
Lord Keepers
Lords Privy Seal
Members of Gray's Inn
Nicholas
English knights
Knights Bachelor
English MPs 1542–1544
English MPs 1545–1547
Burials at St Paul's Cathedral
Members of the Parliament of England for Dartmouth